Raymond Guégan (7 December 1921 – 27 April 2007) was a French racing cyclist. He rode in the 1947 and 1948 Tour de France.

References

External links

1921 births
2007 deaths
French male cyclists
People from Laon
Sportspeople from Aisne
Cyclists from Hauts-de-France